The 2001–02 season was the 103rd season in the existence of Olympique Lyonnais and the club's 13th consecutive season in the top flight of French football. They participated in the French Division 1, the Coupe de France, the Coupe de la Ligue, UEFA Champions League and UEFA Cup.

Season summary
Lyon won their first ever French top-flight title. The title race came down to the final day of the season, with Lyon needing victory against fellow challengers Lens, who were one point ahead. A 3–1 victory secured Lyon's title win.

At the end of the season, Jacques Santini left to manage the France national team. Former Rennes manager Paul Le Guen was appointed as his replacement.

First-team squad
Squad at end of season

Left club during season

Competitions

Overview

Division 1

League table

Results summary

Results by match

Matches

Source:

Coupe de France

Coupe de la Ligue

Champions League

Group stage

UEFA Cup

Third round

Fourth round

Notes and references

Notes

References

Olympique Lyonnais seasons
Lyon
French football championship-winning seasons